Bambusa angustissima is a species of Bambusa bamboo.

Distribution 
Bambusa angustissima is endemic to Gaozhou of Guangdong province of China.

Description 
The plant grows to 900 cm in height and 50 mm diameter for the stems.

References 

angustissima
Flora of Guangdong